Evergem is a municipality located in the Belgian province of East Flanders. In 2021, Evergem had a total population of 35,791.

Demographics

Opm:Bron:NIS

History 

In the 1st world war, Ertvelde was used as a blockade in case the Netherlands attacked from the north. Ertvelde has a lot of bunkers due that, almost every 200m you can find one. Now they're mostly on fields used by farmers. The government decided that the bunkers are from the people where it stand. Some farmers destroyed it and some use it as storage, but some are still visitable.

Famous inhabitants
 Angelus de Baets, portrait painter (1793- Ghent, 1855)
Luc De Vos, singer of the band Gorki
Wilfried Martens, former Belgian prime minister, former chairman of the European People's Party (1963 - 2013)
Eddy Wally, singer

International relations

Twin towns — Sister cities
Evergem is twinned with:

Gallery

References

External links

Official website 

 
Municipalities of East Flanders